Alexeyevka is a rural locality (a village) in Alexeyevsky Selsoviet, Blagovarsky District, Bashkortostan, Russia. The population was 367 as of 2010. There are 3 streets.

Geography 
Alexeyevka is located 37 km northeast of Yazykovo (the district's administrative centre) by road. Novoakbashevo is the nearest rural locality.

References 

Rural localities in Blagovarsky District